Lahore Cantonment is a tehsil located in Lahore District, Punjab, Pakistan. The population is 1,636,342 according to the 2017 census. The Assistant Commissioner is Ms. Qurat-ul-Ain Zafar, PAS. The seat of Government is located in the Cantt Kutchery. The main areas under the Tehsil include: DHA, Lahore Cantt., Walton Cantt., Bedian, Burki, Paragon.

Settlements
Lahore Cantonment
Lahore Metropolitan Corporation
Walton Cantonment

See also 
 List of tehsils of Punjab, Pakistan

References 

Tehsils of Punjab, Pakistan
Populated places in Lahore District